WMOI (97.7 FM) is a radio station broadcasting an adult contemporary format. Licensed to Monmouth, Illinois, the station serves the Monmouth/Galesburg area. WMOI is owned by Robbins-Treat Resources, LLC.

History
The station began broadcasting December 2, 1967 and held the call sign WVPC-FM. In the 1970s, WVPC-FM aired a MOR format, along with an increasing amount of country music programming. The station was an affiliate of the Mutual Broadcasting System. In 1977, the station's call sign was changed to WDRL, and in 1981 its call sign was changed to WMOI.

On October 3, 2018, WPW Broadcasting announced a sale of their Monmouth stations WMOI, WRAM, and WRAM's translator at 94.1, to Monmouth-based Robbins-Treat Resources, LLC for $168,000. The sale was consummated on December 28, 2018.

References

External links
WMOI's website

MOI
Mainstream adult contemporary radio stations in the United States
Radio stations established in 1967
1967 establishments in Illinois